Lydenburg, officially known as Mashishing, is a town in Thaba Chweu Local Municipality, on the Mpumalanga highveld, South Africa. It is situated on the Sterkspruit/Dorps River tributary of the Lepelle River at the summit of the Long Tom Pass. It has a long, rich history, ranging from AD 500 to the present. The name is derived from the Dutch Lijdenburg, or "Town of Suffering", and is named for the experiences of the white settlers. In Northern Sotho, Mashishing means "long green grass." Lydenburg has become the centre of the South African fly-fishing industry and is an agricultural, tourism and mining hub.

History

Lydenburg Heads
Dating back to AD 500, the earliest known forms of African Iron Age sculpture below the equator, known as the Lydenburg heads were found in the area. The seven earthenware sculptures of heads and other pottery from the site are intricately decorated and may have been used for ceremonial or initiation purposes. However, this is speculative as there is little we know today about the people who made these sculptures. Their existence nevertheless points to Lydenburg's remarkable heritage.

Pre-colonial History
The Lydenburg area has a long history of human occupation. Rock paintings in surrounding areas point to early Khoe-San hunter-gather groups living on the land. In addition to the Lydenburg heads, there is significant Iron Age evidence of settlement of the area possibly by the Bakoni people. There is evidence of Bapedi people living in Lydenburg as early as the 1700s. The area surrounding Lyndenburg was traditionally known to the Pedi as Mashishing.

Colonial history
Lydenburg was founded in 1849 by a group of Voortrekkers under the leadership of Andries Potgieter when they abandoned their previous settlement Ohrigstad (to the north) due to a malaria epidemic. The town became the capital of the Lydenburg Republic ('De Republiek Lydenburg in Zuid Afrika') in 1856 and later in 1857 joined the Republic of Utrecht but in 1860 both these republics joined the Zuid Afrikaanse Republiek (ZAR). The town became the capital of the Lydenburg District of the South African Republic (ZAR).

Lydenburg became important because it was on the wagon route to the port of Delagoa Bay (now Maputo Bay) which was free of British control. In 1871 construction of the road was started by Abraham Espag under the orders of President Thomas François Burgers. The first wagons arrived in Lydenburg from Delagoa Bay in 1874.

On 6 February 1873, alluvial gold was discovered and within 3 months the Lydenburg goldfields were proclaimed. The First Boer War broke out between Britain and the Transvaal Republic in 1880. A British garrison under Lieutenant Walter Hillyar Colquhoun Long (uncle of the 1st Viscount Long) occupied Lydenburg to control the goldfields. It was from here that the ill-fated 94th Regiment under the command of Lieutenant-Colonel Philip Robert Anstruther marched to Pretoria. The remainder of the garrison at Lydenburg was besieged from 6 January 1881, following Long's refusal to surrender the garrison on 23 December 1880.

Land such as Boomplaats and Aapiesdoorndraai farms, near the town, was purchased by black South Africans in the early 1900s before the 1913 Land Act severely restricted black land ownership in South Africa. The communities here developed and irrigated the initially arid area into valuable and productive farms.

By 1910 the railway reached Lydenburg. In 1927 Lydenburg became a municipality.

Apartheid-Era History

Forced removals from farms surrounding Lydenburg began in the early 1940s and continued through the 1960s. Residents on the farms, especially through the ICU, ANC and local chiefs, resisted the removals in different ways depending on local circumstances and allegiances. Often violently, the apartheid state removed the families to farms further from the town or to Sekhukhuneland. In 2001, in one of South Africa's first completed land restitution claims, Boomplaats farm was bought from Willem Pretorius and returned by the state to the Dinkwanyane community.

Name change 
In June 2006, it was announced that Arts and Culture minister, Pallo Jordan, had approved the renaming Lydenburg to Mashishing, meaning "wind blowing through the grass".

Education

 Marambane Primary School
 Lydenburg Primary School
 Höerskool Lydenburg Highschool
 Mashishing Secondary School
 Mashishing Campus Ehlanzeni TVET College
 Lesodi primary school, Mashingshing.

Tourist attractions

 Lydenburg Museum
 Long Tom Pass
 Sterkspruit Nature Reserve

See also 

 Bapedi
 Lydenburg heads
 Mpumalanga
 Sekhukhuneland
 Jock of the Bushveld

References 

Populated places in the Thaba Chweu Local Municipality
Mining communities in South Africa
Populated places founded by Afrikaners
Populated places established in 1849
1849 establishments in Africa
Former republics